Barry Mark Eisler (born 1964) is a best-selling American novelist. He is the author of two thriller series, the first featuring anti-hero John Rain, a half-Japanese, half-American former soldier turned freelance assassin, and a second featuring black ops soldier Ben Treven.  Eisler also writes about politics and language on his blog Heart of the Matter, and at the blogs CHUD, Firedoglake, The Huffington Post, MichaelMoore.com, The Smirking Chimp, and Truthout.

Early life
Eisler was born in New Jersey, his father was a wholesale office supplier, and his mother an environmental activist. Eisler graduated from Cornell Law School in 1989.

Early career
After completing law school, Eisler joined the CIA, where he trained for three years afterward and held a covert position with the Directorate of Operations. In 1992, he resigned and joined the law firm Weil, Gotshal & Manges. In 1994, he moved to the San Francisco Bay Area to work for the firm's technology licensing division, then left to work in Japan for Matsushita.

In 1999, he returned to the Bay Area to join a startup.

In 2003, he started writing full-time, when he sold the rights to his debut novel, Rain Fall, the first of his series featuring John Rain.

Self-publishing
Eisler made news in March 2011 when he walked away from a reported half million dollar advance from St. Martin's Press in order to go the self-publishing route pioneered by his colleague Joe Konrath and others. He then took a six-figure deal to publish the seventh John Rain novel, The Detachment (2011), under Amazon Publishing's Thomas & Mercer mystery imprint.

Awards
Eisler's novel Rain Fall won the 2005 Barry Award for Best Thriller  and The Gumshoe Award. Fault Line reached Number 18 on The New York Times Hardcover Bestseller List.

Bibliography
After amicably terminating his previous publishing contracts and regaining his rights, Eisler  changed the titles and covers on all the Rain books, and the covers of the Treven books.

John Rain
 Graveyard of Memories (2014)
 Zero Sum (2017)
 A Clean Kill in Tokyo (2002), previously published as Rain Fall
 A Lonely Resurrection (2003), previously published as Hard Rain in the US and Blood from Blood in the UK 
 Winner Take All (2004), previously published as Rain Storm in the US and Choke Point in the UK  (Barry Awards for best thriller)
 Redemption Games (2005), previously published as Killing Rain in the US and One Last Kill in the UK 
 Extremis (2006), previously published as The Last Assassin (Barry Awards for best thriller nominee)
 The Killer Ascendant (2007), previously published as Requiem for an Assassin 
 "Paris is a Bitch" (Rain/Delilah, 2011), short story
 The Detachment (2011)(w/ Ben Treven)
 "Decisions, Decisions" (2011)(w/ Dr. Morgan Snow)
 "The Khmer Kill" (Dox, 2012), short story
 "London Twist" (Delilah, 2013), novella
 The Killer Collective (1 February 2019) (w/Livia Lone)
 The Chaos Kind (October 2021) (w/Livia Lone/Marvin Manus)

Ben Treven
 Fault Line (2009)
 Inside Out (2010)
 "The Lost Coast" (Larison, 2011), short story
 The Detachment (2011) (w/ John Rain)

Livia Lone
 Livia Lone (2016)
 The Night Trade (2018) (w/Dox)
 The Killer Collective (1 February 2019) (w/John Rain)
 All the Devils (27 August 2019)

Marvin Manus
 The God's Eye View (2016)

Dox
 Amok (2022)

Essays

Screen adaptations
In April 2009, Sony Pictures Japan released a mostly Japanese language film version of Rain Fall starring Shiina Kippei as Rain and Gary Oldman as Rain's nemesis, CIA Station Chief William Holtzer.

In August 2014, Slingshot Global Media announced the launch of a new TV mini-series, Rain, based on the book. Keanu Reeves will portray the iconic character as well as serve as the executive producer alongside Eisler, Chad Stahelski, and David Leitch. The scriptwriter is yet to be decided upon.

Personal life
Eisler earned a black belt at the Kodokan International Judo Center and lives in the San Francisco Bay Area. He is married to literary agent Laura Rennert, who represents his work. They have one daughter.

References

External links 

 
 Barry Eisler Interviews
 Eisler's blog, Heart of the Matter
 Eisler on Truthout
 Article on the John Rain Books by Jeff Riggenbach
 
 Eisler on GRITtv
 Eisler on The Young Turks

See also

Assassinations in fiction

People from New Jersey
1964 births
American spy fiction writers
Cornell Law School alumni
Living people
Barry Award winners
American male novelists